Ellicott R. Stillman (March 6, 1844 – February 13, 1911) was an American politician and businessman.

Born in Rochester, New York, Stillman served in the 85th New York Volunteer Infantry during the American Civil War. In 1886, Stillman moved to Michigan and, then, in 1887, settled in Milwaukee, Wisconsin. He was involved with the manufacturing of lumber and copperage. In 1895, Stillman served in the Wisconsin State Assembly and was a Republican. He served as postmaster of Milwaukee. In 1910, Stillman moved to Waukesha, Wisconsin and was involved with the mineral water business. He died at his home in Waukesha, Wisconsin after suffering a stroke.

Notes

1844 births
1911 deaths
Businesspeople from Rochester, New York
Politicians from Milwaukee
Politicians from Waukesha, Wisconsin
People of New York (state) in the American Civil War
Republican Party members of the Wisconsin State Assembly
Wisconsin postmasters
19th-century American politicians
Politicians from Rochester, New York
19th-century American businesspeople
Businesspeople in wood products